James Kovach (born May 1, 1956) is an American entrepreneur, physician, attorney and former American football linebacker who played seven seasons in the National Football League for the New Orleans Saints and San Francisco 49ers. He played college football at the University of Kentucky, where he also studied medicine.

Early life

Kovach played as a linebacker at University of Kentucky while studying pre-medicine. Because he had an injury-related redshirt season, he played his senior year of eligibility while taking his freshman year at University of Kentucky College of Medicine.

Career

National Football League
Kovach was drafted by the New Orleans Saints in the 1979 NFL draft and played for the team for six seasons, while completing his medical education at University of Kentucky College of Medicine in the off-seasons. October 7, 1984 James Kovach was the player that tackled Walter Payton on the play that Walter Payton broke Jim Browns rushing record. In 1985, he played as a linebacker for the San Francisco 49ers. After his retirement from the NFL, Kovach earned his J.D. degree from Stanford University School of Law and practiced as an intellectual-property attorney before becoming a business owner.

Post-NFL career
Kovach has also worked with several organizations in the fields of aging research. He is a former president of the Buck Institute for Research on Aging. Kovach is a member of the National Football League concussion committee.

In 2010, Kovach was recognized by the College Sports Information Directors of America as member of the Academic All-America Hall of Fame.

Kovach was the COO and SVP of Business Development of  CrowdOptic.

He is currently the Director, Entrepreneurism and Innovation at the University of California Davis Health.

See also
New Orleans Saints

References

1956 births
Living people
American football linebackers
Kentucky Wildcats football players
New Orleans Saints players
San Francisco 49ers players
American businesspeople
American geriatricians
American lawyers
People from Parma Heights, Ohio
Stanford Law School alumni
University of Kentucky College of Medicine alumni